The following is a list of events relating to television in Ireland from 2005.

Events

January
No events

February
No events

March
3 March – Taoiseach Bertie Ahern opens RTÉ's new studios in London, based at Millbank opposite the British Houses of Parliament.

April
No events

May
29 May – The RTÉ Annual Report announces the broadcaster has made a €6.8 million operating profit. The report also says that their television channels, RTÉ One and RTÉ Two can be received by 99.1% of the Irish population.

June
No events

July
No events

August
No events

September
No events

October
4 October – The cable television station City Channel Dublin, part of the City Channel network goes on air.

November
No events

December
No events

Debuts

RTÉ
10 January –  Cyborg 009 on RTÉ Two (2001–2002)
11 January –  Sergeant Stripes on RTÉ Two (2003–2004)
13 January –  Sonic X on RTÉ Two (2003–2006)
26 January – The Colony on RTÉ One (2005)
23 May –  Lost (2004–2010)
13 June – Haughey on RTÉ One (2005)
15 June –  Gordon the Garden Gnome on RTÉ Two (2005)
9 July – Saturday Night with Miriam on RTÉ One (2005–present)
5 September –  Peppa Pig on RTÉ Two (2004–present)
19 September – Dustin's Daily News on RTÉ Two (2005–2007)
20 September – Naked Camera on RTÉ Two (2005–2007)
26 September –  Danny Phantom on RTÉ Two (2004–2007)
28 September –  Trollz on RTÉ Two (2005)
14 November – The Last Furlong (2005)
Undated –  W.I.T.C.H. on RTÉ Two (2004–2006)

TV3
9 November – The Brendan Courtney Show (2005–2006)

TG4
8 September –  The Batman (2004–2008)
10 October – GAA... (2005–present)
Undated – Paisean Faisean (2005)
Undated –  Zombie Hotel (2005–2007)

Changes of network affiliation

Ongoing television programmes

1960s
RTÉ News: Nine O'Clock (1961–present)
RTÉ News: Six One (1962–present)
The Late Late Show (1962–present)

1970s
The Late Late Toy Show (1975–present)
RTÉ News on Two (1978–2014)
The Sunday Game (1979–present)

1980s
Dempsey's Den (1986–2010)
Questions and Answers (1986–2009)
Fair City (1989–present)
RTÉ News: One O'Clock (1989–present)

1990s
 Would You Believe (1990s–present)
Winning Streak (1990–present)
Prime Time (1992–present)
Nuacht RTÉ (1995–present)
Fame and Fortune (1996–2006)
Nuacht TG4 (1996–present)
Ros na Rún (1996–present)
A Scare at Bedtime (1997–2006)
The Premiership/Premier Soccer Saturday (1998–2013)
Sports Tonight (1998–2009)
TV3 News (1998–present)
The View (1999–2011)
Ireland AM (1999–present)
Telly Bingo (1999–present)

2000s
Nationwide (2000–present)
TV3 News at 5.30 (2001–present)
You're a Star (2002–2008)
Auld Ones (2003–2007)
Killinaskully (2003–2008)
The Clinic (2003–2009)
The Panel (2003–2011)
Against the Head (2003–present)
news2day (2003–present)
Other Voices (2003–present)Tubridy Tonight (2004–2009)The Afternoon Show (2004–2010)Ryan Confidential (2004–2010)

Ending this year
April – Proof (2004–2005)
4 July – Haughey (2005)
1 September – Play it Again Des (2003–2005)
19 December – The Last Furlong (2005)
Undated – Kelly (1989–2005)
Undated – Paisean Faisean'' (2005)

See also
2005 in Ireland

References